20 manat - ( and ) is one of the banknotes in Azerbaijan and Turkmenistan.

Features of banknotes

Banknotes in circulation

See also 

Azerbaijani manat
Turkmenistani manat

References 

Currencies of Turkmenistan
Twenty-base-unit banknotes